Gunman Clive is a platform game developed and published by Swedish development studio Hörberg Productions. It was first released for Android on 2 April 2012. The game follows a lone gunslinger in a futuristic Wild West as he tries to save the mayor's daughter from a group of technologically well-armed bandits.

In 2015, a sequel, Gunman Clive 2, was released.

Gameplay and plot 

Gunman Clive is a side-scrolling platform game. The game is set in the year 18XX. The player controls the character Gunman Clive or Ms. Johnson as they fight enemies across 20 levels to rescue the mayor's daughter. The player has to traverse a 2D world filled with moving platforms, traps and enemies. The player can pick up power-ups such as a spread shot, explosive bullets, and a laser gun. Enemies vary from bandits who carry rifles and dynamite to animals such as pelicans and wolves. Bosses appear in every fifth level. All the player characters have life meters.

The 2D graphics are in the style of sketches, making the game resemble an interactive flip book. Gunman Clives soundtrack pays tribute to the Western genre of video games. The differences between Gunman Clive and Ms. Johnson are that Ms. Johnson is slower, freezes in place while shooting, and has a skirt that can slow down descent. A third playable character, a duck, is unlocked after completion of the game. Gunman Clive has three difficulty settings, which differ in how much damage the player character takes with each hit and where the player character respawns after death.

Release
In Japan, the game was released by Flyhigh Works.

The game was approved through Steam Greenlight in November 2013. In October 2015, Bertil Hörberg released a one level ROM of Gunman Clive for the Game Boy line and for the Super NES on May 30, 2016.

Reception

Gunman Clive received generally positive reviews after its release from both mainstream and video game journalists. The gameplay, art and style were praised by Destructoid, which said that its major flaws are its short length, game freezes during the second boss fight, and sometimes inappropriate soundtrack. Destructoid also noted that the game takes many ideas from the Mega Man series. Destructoid described it as "a steal at $2" and said that "fans of 2D action platformers need to check it out. If Hörberg Productions is ever graced with the opportunity to develop a mainline Mega Man game, I'm confident that fans of the series would be happy with the results." IGN described it as "a brief experience, but still one well worth experiencing if you’re looking for a fine $2 platformer on your 3DS. The stellar game design is emboldened by the three different characters you can play as. From start to finish, Gunman Clive is a fantastic platformer, good enough that it is worth playing multiple times to play as every character."

Sales 

By January 2015, more than 400,000 copies of the game had been sold, with over eighty percent of sales on the 3DS. The Gunman Clive HD Collection was sold 9,000 times until January 2016.

Legacy 
A sequel, Gunman Clive 2, was released for the Nintendo 3DS on 29 January 2015. The story now takes Clive around the world to chase after the leader of the bandits from the first game. In June 2015, Bertil Hörberg announced the two games would be released on the Wii U as Gunman Clive HD Collection. The collection was also released on the Nintendo Switch on January 17, 2019, and PlayStation 4 on May 22, 2020.

Clive, Ms. Johnson and the duck enemy appeared as three of the playable guest characters in the 2D action RPG game Drancia Saga for the Nintendo 3DS.

Clive will appear as an assist character in the upcoming indie fighting game Fraymakers.

References

External links 
 
Official profile at nintendo.com
List of soundtracks in Gunman Clive

2012 video games
Android (operating system) games
Flyhigh Works games
Hörberg Productions games
Indie video games
IOS games
Nintendo 3DS eShop games
Nintendo 3DS games
Nintendo Switch games
Platform games
Side-scrolling video games
Video games developed in Sweden
Video games featuring female protagonists
Video games set in the United States
Western (genre) video games
Wii U games
Windows games
Single-player video games